Cynthia Zarin (born 1959) is an American poet and journalist.

Life
She graduated from Harvard University magna cum laude, and Columbia University with an M.F.A.

She married Michael Seccareccia on January 24, 1988, but later divorced.
She married Joseph Goddu on December 6, 1997, but later divorced.

She teaches at Yale University. She has written for the New York Times, Architectural Digest, and is a contributing editor for Gourmet, and staff writer at the New Yorker, where she writes frequently about books and theatre. Other works include libretti for two ballets for the New York based company BalletCollective, directed by Troy Schumacher, "The Impulse Wants Company" and "Dear and Blackbirds. Her poems have appeared in The Paris Review, Poetry, Grand Street, The Nation, and are widely anthologized.

Awards
 National Endowment for the Arts fellowship in poetry
 artist in residence at St. John the Divine.
 Peter I. Lavan Award
 New York Women's Press Award for Writing on the Arts
 Ingram Merrill Foundation Award for Poetry 
 2002, she received the Los Angeles Times Book Prize
2011 Guggenheim Fellowship

Bibliography

Poetry
Collections 
 
 
 
 
The Ada Poems,  Alfred A Knopf 2010.  
Orbit, Alfred A. Knopf 2017.  
List of poems
 
 
 

Anthologies
Norton Anthology of Poetry

Non-fiction
 
 
 
 "After Hamlet: A Shakespearian Maverick Comes to Broadway" The New Yorker, May 2008.
 "Not Nice: Maurice Sendak and The Perils of Childhood" The New Yorker, April 2006.
"Teen Queen: Looking For Lady Jane" The New Yorker, October, 2007.
 An Enlarged Heart, A Personal History, Alfred A. Knopf 2013.

Children's books

References

External links
 "conversation with Cynthia Zarin", Boldtype
 " Cynthia Zarin", February 12, 2009, Poetry Series, News Hour, PBS

1959 births
Living people
Harvard University alumni
Columbia University School of the Arts alumni
Yale University faculty
American women poets
American women journalists
20th-century American poets
20th-century American women writers
20th-century American journalists
21st-century American poets
21st-century American women writers
21st-century American journalists
The New Yorker staff writers
American women academics